Deadly Love is a 1995 Lifetime Original Movie starring Susan Dey as a lonely vampire photographer. The film was based on the book Love Bites by Sherry Gottlieb and co-stars Stephen McHattie.

Plot
Rebecca Barnes (Susan Dey) is a successful photographer who has it all—including the curse of vampiric immortality.  Longing for companionship, Barnes leaves a disastrous trail of blood-less bodies in her wake.  Shockingly, photographs that she snapped of one of the victims brings Rebecca into the police investigation and into the arms of Detective Sean O'Connor (Stephen McHattie). As the passion between Sean and Rebecca mounts, so does the evidence against her.

Cast
 Susan Dey ...  Rebecca Barnes
 Stephen McHattie ...  Sean O'Connor
Eric Peterson ...  Elliott
 Julie Khaner ...  Poole
 Robert S. Woods ...  Jim King
 Jean LeClerc ... Trombitas Dracu
David Ferry ...  Sal Consentino
Roman Podhora ...  Steve Merritt
Henry Alessandroni ...  Forman
Kelly Fiddick ...  Griffith
Suzanne Coy ...  Rita Berwald
Jim Codrington ...  Derek Green
Bernard Browne ...  Cab Driver
Kevin Le Roy ...  Firebreather

References

External links

 

1995 horror films
1995 films
Films based on American horror novels
Lifetime (TV network) films
American vampire films
Films scored by Maribeth Solomon
Films scored by Micky Erbe
Vampires in television
Films directed by Jorge Montesi
1990s American films